Hafiz Muhammad Ahmad (also known as Muhammad Ahmad Nanautawi) (1862-1930) was an Indian Muslim scholar, who served as the Vice Chancellor of the Darul Uloom Deoband for thirty five years. He was the Grand Mufti of the Hyderabad State from 1922 to 1925.

Biography
Ahmad was born in 1862 in Nanauta into the Siddiqi family; his father was Islamic scholar Muhammad Qasim Nanautawi. He attended Madrasa Manba-ul-Ulum in Gulauthi and then Madrasa Shahi, Moradabad. He later returned to Darul Uloom Deoband where he studied with Mahmud Hasan Deobandi. He studied parts of the Jami` at-Tirmidhi with Muhammad Yaqub Nanautawi and specialized in hadith with Rashid Ahmad Gangohi. He was a disciple of Imdadullah Muhajir Makki.

At Darul Uloom Deoband, he taught Mishkat al-Masabih, Tafsir al-Jalalayn, Sahih Muslim, Sunan ibn Majah for ten years, and served as Vice Chancellor for 35 years.

Ahmad was honored with the title of Shamsul Ulama by the British Government of India, which he returned in 1920. He also served Grand Mufti of Hyderabad State from 1922 to 1925.

Students
Ahmad's students include Anwar Shah Kashmiri, Shabbir Ahmad Usmani, Ubaidullah Sindhi, Hussain Ahmad Madani, Kifayatullah Dehlawi, Sayyid Asghar Hussain Deobandi, Qari Muhammad Tayyib, Muhammad Shafi Deobandi, Manazir Ahsan Gilani and Syed Fakhruddin Ahmad.

Death and legacy
Ahmad died in 1930 while travelling in a train near Nizamabad Junction railway station and was buried in a special graveyard Khitta-e-Salihin with the consent of Mir Osman Ali Khan. Ahmad's son Qari Muhammad Tayyib was Vice Chancellor of Darul Uloom Deoband for fifty years.

See also
 Ibrahim Ali Tashna

Notes

References

Citations

Bibliography

 
 

Darul Uloom Deoband alumni
1862 births
1930 deaths
Deobandis
Academic staff of Darul Uloom Deoband
People from Nanauta
Qasmi family
Students of Mahmud Hasan Deobandi
Vice-Chancellors of Darul Uloom Deoband